Engativá is the 10th locality of Bogotá. It is located in the west of the city. This district is mostly inhabited by lower middle and working class residents.

Etymology 
Engativá is either derived from Ingativá; cacique Inga; "Land of the Sun", or from the Chibcha words Engue-tivá; engue is "delicious" and tivá is "captain"; "captain of the delicious [people]".

Geography 
Engativá is limited to the north by the Salitre River with Suba, to the east by Avenida Carrera 68 and Bosa, to the south by Avenida El Dorado and Fontibón, and to the west by the Bogotá River.

History 
Engativá was a village in the confederation of the Muisca. Modern Engativá was founded in 1537. It has become a rural territory, people used to work as farmers of Bogotá in 1571. The church of the town was built in honor of the pope Clemente XII in 1638 and from 1737 it was named the Nuestra Señora de los Dolores's Sanctuary. The church was destroyed by earthquakes, but was rebuilt in 1960.

References 

Localities of Bogotá
Altiplano Cundiboyacense
Muisca Confederation
Muysccubun